Easton Rangers is a Sierra Leonean football club based in Freetown, Sierra Leone. It is currently a member of the Sierra Leone National First Division, the second highest football league in Sierra Leone.

References

External links
http://www.rsssf.com/tabless/sier07.html

Football clubs in Sierra Leone
Sport in Freetown